Stacy Gaskill (born May 21, 2000) is an American snowboarder who competes internationally in the snowboard cross discipline. She represented the United States at the 2022 Winter Olympics.

Career
Gaskill represented the United States at the 2022 Winter Olympics in the snowboard cross event.

She competed at the 2019–20 FIS Freestyle Ski World Cup, and 2021–22 FIS Freestyle Ski World Cup.

Personal life
Gaskill's mother, Martha, represented the United States at the 1988 Winter Paralympics.

References

2000 births
Living people
American female snowboarders
People from Denver
Snowboarders at the 2022 Winter Olympics
Olympic snowboarders of the United States

External links